Bilgish (Bilgeş) is a rural locality (a village) in Kashkinsky Selsoviet, Askinsky District, Bashkortostan, Russia. The population was 329 as of 2010. There are seven streets.

Geography 
Bilgish is located 31 km southeast of Askino (the district's administrative centre) by road. Kashkino is the nearest rural locality.

References 

Rural localities in Askinsky District